Musikhjälpen ("Music Aid") is the Swedish version of the Dutch Serious Request radio and television campaign. The annual show is an appeal for money which each year helps a certain cause. Three radio/television personalities are locked inside a glass house for 144 hours, and they broadcast live on Swedish public service radio network Sveriges Radio and on public services television through SVT. People send text messages requesting a song, with each text costing 50, 100, 200, or 500 Swedish kronor. In later years, a Musikhjälpen-app has been used for requesting songs as well.

Musikhjälpen 2008

Theme – "" ("67 million refugees need your help")
In 2008, Sweden held the event for the first time, with SVT Sveriges Radio and Radiohjälpen as main organizers. Each year since the show has been held and broadcast as Musikhjälpen.

The 2008 glass house stood at Gustaf Adolfs torg in Malmö from 13 to 19 December. The show was broadcast around the clock at Sveriges Radio P3 and Din gata 100,6, and also on SVT2 at certain schedules during the day. It was hosted by the radio presenters Kitty Jutbring, Henrik Torehammar and Ehsan Noroozi. A daily half-hour highlights show Musikhjälpen: Extra was hosted by Fredrik Ekelund and Charlotte Lundgren. Singer Jason Diakité (also known by his stage name Timbuktu) was a reporter, and traveled a month before Musikhjälpen to Congo, where he met refugees and assisted the organization on the ground.

In its first year, Musikhjälpen gained 3,016,247 SEK in donations.

Musikhjälpen 2009 

Theme – "" ("Your music stops malaria")
In 2009, the Musikhjälpen glass house stood at Avenyn in Gothenburg between 14–20 December. The theme for this year was malaria and as in 2008 the show was broadcast live around the clock at Sveriges Radio P3 and on SVT Play at certain times. The hosts were radio presenters Ametist Azordegan, Christer Lundberg and rapper Jason Diakité (aka Timbuktu), who all got locked into the glass house by singer Alice Cooper. Traveling reporters this year were Ehsan Noroozi and Kitty Jutbring. The Musikhjälpen Extra host was Mela Tesfazion.

5,748,442 SEK was raised this year, approximately 2,300,000 more than in 2008.

On 7 January 2010, it was revealed that the project had been defrauded during twenty minutes on the night of 19–20 December. The number shown in the television screens which showed how to wish for songs and give money had been changed. No money was ever given to the fake number and no arrests were ever made.

Musikhjälpen 2010
Theme – "" ("Children are not for sale")
In 2010, the glass house was located in Malmö for the second time in 3 years. Jason Diakité (Timbuktu) hosted again alongside morning-radio host Martina Thun and comedian Nour El-Refai. Ametist Azordegan and Christer Lundberg were traveling reporters this year and theme was the trafficking of children. As before, the show was broadcast on Sveriges Radio P3 and SVT Play, and at times on SVT during 13–19 December.

By 18 December 2010, the previous year's record total had already been broken; when the show was over 12,236,417 SEK had been collected to help the victims of trafficking.

Musikhjälpen 2011 

Theme – "" ("All girls have the right to go to school")
In 2011, the glass house was located in Gothenburg for a second time, at the Gustaf Adolfs torg square between 12–18 December. For the third time in a row, rapper Jason Diakité hosted the show, along with TV-personality Gina Dirawi and radio presenter Kodjo Akolor. The theme for this year was that all girls should have the right to get an education. The travelling reporters for this year were comedian Klara Zimmergren and artist Daniel Adams-Ray, who visited Ethiopia.

264 auctions were held which raised 2.1 million SEK. Among the auctioned items was Michael Jackson's platinum record for his Thriller.

A total of 18,104,362 SEK was raised.

Musikhjälpen 2012
Theme – "" ("Slum children have the right to clean water")
Malmö again hosted the event, from 10 to 16 December, for the third time. For the second year in a row Jason Diakité (Timbuktu), Kodjo Akolor and Gina Dirawi were the hosts of the Musikhjälpen and were locked inside the glass house. This became Timbuktu's fourth year as host of the show.

A total of 135,000 song-requests were registered, and 23,301,823 SEK was raised, again a steady increase to the previous year.

Filip and Fredrik auctioned themselves off as receptionists, which raised 221,100 SEK.

Musikhjälpen 2013 

Theme – "" ("All girls have the right to survive a pregnancy")
Musikhjälpen was held in Gothenburg between 9–15 December 2013. This was the third time that Gothenburg had been the host city of Musikhjälpen. The show was broadcast from Gustaf Adolfs torg and this year the money was used to help pregnant girls in poorer countries.

The show's hosts were Kodjo Akolor for the third time, artist Sarah Dawn Finer and radio presenter Emma Knyckare.

For the first time since 2009, Musikhjälpen Extra was a daily show; it was hosted by Sofia Rågenklint. This year's travelling reporters were Bianca Kronlöf and Robin Olin, who went to Bangladesh to give daily live reports from the country. It was the first time that the traveling reporters were at the foreign location live throughout Musikhjälpen's broadcast.

28,426,046 SEK was raised.

Musikhjälpen 2014
Theme – "" ("Help us to stop the spread of HIV")
In an after-Musikhjälpen programme for the 2013 show on 29 May 2014 Sveriges Radio revealed that there would be a 2014 edition of the aid show. For the first time Musikhjälpen was held in Uppsala. The glass house stood at Stora torget between 8 and 14 December.

Hosts for this year were the artist Linnea Henriksson, Swedish rapper Petter and radio presenter Kodjo Akolor. Travelling reporter for this edition was the blog- and TV-personality William Spetz, and destination for this year's travel was Mozambique.

Musikhjälpen 2015 
Theme – "" ("No one should have to flee the climate")
Musikhjälpen was broadcast in 2015 for the first time from Linköping between 13 and 19 December. The theme for this year was "No one should have to flee the climate", with focus on climate related catastrophe which has forced million of people to flee. This year Kodjo Akolor, Gina Dirawi and Linnea Henriksson presented the show during the live radio and television broadcasts which was on SVT and Sveriges Radio. Samir Badran would have been the "publics ambassador", but decided to withdraw the same day as the broadcasts was about to start because of an Instagram post. The day after it was announced that Farah Erichsén and Oscar Zia became new ambassadors. The travelling reporter for this year was  Clara Henry, who reported from the Philippines.

The total sum of money raised was 31,105,000 (SEK) which was a new record. The single thing that brought in the most money was a bidding on a "taco evening" along with singer Miriam Bryant which gave 103,025 (SEK) to the cause.

Musikhjälpen 2016 

Theme – "" ("Children in war have the right to go to school")
Musikhjälpen was broadcast in 2016 for the first time from Örebro between 12 and 18 December. The hosts were Kodjo Akolor, musicians Pelle "Howlin' Pelle" Almqvist from The Hives  and Josefine "Little Jinder" Jinder. This year's public ambassadors was Farah Abadi and Oscar Zia. Travelling reporter for this edition was Molly Nutley who travelled to Africa to meet people that had fled the wars. 49,003,745 SEK was raised this year which was a new record.

Musikhjälpen 2017
Theme – "" ("Children are not for sale")
The tenth Musikhjälpen was hosted at Rådhustorget in Umeå. The three presenters for this year was Farah Abadi, Kalle Zackari Wahlström and Molly Sandén which was locked inside a glass house to host 144 hours of live radio as earlier years.  This edition was held between 11 and 17 December. The ambassadors for the audience this year was blogger Hanna "HanaPee" Persson and adventurer and athlete Aron Anderson. Travelling reporter for this year was  Linnea Henriksson who travelled to the Philippines. This year broke the record for money received as 74,410,363 (SEK) was collected.

Musikhjälpen 2018

Theme – "" ("Everyone is entitled to function differently")

The city of Lund was the host of the eleventh edition of Musikhjälpen. The program was broadcast between 10 and 16 December at Stortorget in Lund and hosts for this year was Daniel Adams-Ray, William Spetz and Farah Abadi, all three has in earlier years been part of Musikhjälpen as travelling reporters. The theme for this year was built around people with special needs that live in poor and underdeveloped nations. Travelling reporter was Hanna Persson "HanaPee" who visited Guatemala. Ambassadors for this year was Peg Parnevik and Aron Anderson.

During the week 50,550,204 (SEK) was collected.

Musikhjälpen 2019 

Theme – "" ("Sex is not a weapon")
Musikhjälpen 2019 was hosted between 9–15 December 2019 in Stora torget in Västerås. This was the first time Musikhjälpen was broadcast from Västerås, presenters for this year was announced on 11 November as Farah Abadi, Miriam Bryant and Daniel Hallberg. The travelling reporter for this years edition was singer Janice Kavander, she travelled to Uganda. Ambassadors for the audience this year was Arantxa Alvarez and Aron Anderson.

This year a total of 50 572 139 (SEK) was collected.

Musikhjälpen 2020 
Theme – "" ("No human should be left without hospital care")
Musikhjälpen 2020 was hosted between 14–20 December 2020. Firstly this years Musikhjälpen was to be held in Norrköping, but because of the COVID-19 pandemic, it was decided that this year's edition was to be held at a location in Stockholm. Presenters for this year are Brita Zackari, Farah Abadi and Felix Sandman.

Musikhjälpen 2021 
Theme –  "" ("For a world without child labor")
Musikhjälpen 2021 was hosted between 13–19 December 2021, at Gamla Torget in Norrköping. With Brita Zackari, Oscar Zia and Anis Don Demina as presenters. On 15 December Oscar Zia had to leave the glass house as he suffered from a cold. He was replaced by Kodjo Akolor. On 16 December, it was revealed that Anis Don Demina had also become sick with a cold and had to leave the glass house, he was replaced by Linnea Henriksson.

Musikhjälpen 2022
Theme –  ""
Musikhjälpen 2022 was hosted between 12–18 December 2022, at Kungstorget in Gothenburg. Presenters for this year is Klas Eriksson,
Tina Mehrafzoon and Oscar Zia.

References

External links

2008 radio programme debuts
Children's charities based in Sweden
Development charities based in Sweden
Swedish radio programs
History of radio
Humanitarian aid
2008 establishments in Sweden
Annual events in Sweden